Converse-Jackson Township Public Library is a historic Carnegie library building located at Converse, Miami County, Indiana.  It was built in 1918, as a one-story, Classical Revival style brick and masonry building on a raised basement. It has a low-sloped roof surrounded by a parapet and features an entry flanked by two Doric order limestone columns. It was built with a $9,000 grant from the Carnegie Foundation.

It was listed on the National Register of Historic Places in 1999. The Converse-Jackson Township Public Library remains in operation as one of two active public libraries in Miami County. The current library director is Purdue University graduate Andrew Horner of nearby Amboy.

References

External links
Library website

Carnegie libraries in Indiana
Libraries on the National Register of Historic Places in Indiana
Neoclassical architecture in Indiana
Library buildings completed in 1918
Buildings and structures in Miami County, Indiana
National Register of Historic Places in Miami County, Indiana